Langton may refer to:

Places

Canada
Langton, Ontario

England
Church Langton, Leicestershire
East Langton, Leicestershire
Great Langton, North Yorkshire
Langton, Cumbria
Langton, County Durham
Langton, Lincolnshire
Langton, North Yorkshire
Langton Green, Kent
Langton Hall, Leicestershire
Langton Herring, Dorset
Langton Long Blandford, Dorset
Langton Matravers, Dorset
Little Langton, North Yorkshire
Thorpe Langton, Leicestershire
Tur Langton, Leicestershire

Scotland
Langton, Scottish Borders
Langton Castle

Wales
Langton, Pembrokeshire

Other uses

Langton (surname)
Langton's ant